Kashipur Union is an Union Parishad under Lohagara Upazila of Narail District in the division of Khulna, Bangladesh. It has an area of 49.21 km2 (19.00 sq mi) and a population of 13,608.

References

Unions of Lohagara Upazila, Narail
Unions of Narail District
Unions of Khulna Division